The 1991–92 VfB Stuttgart season was the 71st season in the club's history and the 15th season since promotion from 2. Bundesliga Süd in 1977. Stuttgart won the league, the second Bundesliga title for the club and the fourth German championship.

The club also participated in the DFB-Pokal and UEFA Cup, where it reached quarter-finals and second round respectively.

Competitions

Overview

Bundesliga

DFB Pokal

UEFA Cup

First round

Second round

Statistics

Squad statistics

|}

References

VfB Stuttgart seasons
Stuttgart
German football championship-winning seasons